"Shpalman®" is a 2003 single by Elio e le Storie Tese featuring Max Pezzali, anticipating the album Cicciput.

In 2003, Elio e le Storie Tese won the Best Italian Videoclip award at the Italian Music Awards of Federation of the Italian Music Industry for the videoclip of the song.

In the same year, the band released a remixed vinyl record of the single titled "Shpalman® RMX", which sees the collaboration, among others, of Gabry Ponte.

The song tells the story of a superhero that, to defeat evil people, douses their faces with excrements. It is written by the band's keyboard player Rocco Tanica, along with Italian singer Max Pezzali as a guest.

Track listing
Shpalman®
 "Shpalman® (radio edit)" – 3:33
 "Budy Giampi (radio edit)" – 4:38
 "Budy Giampi (karaoke)" – 4:38

Shpalman® RMX
 Side A
 "Gabry Ponte Remix" (Extended)
 "Gabry Ponte Remix" (Radio Cut)

 Side B
 "Bidda Remix" (Extended)
 "Bidda Remix" (Radio Version)

Charts

References

External links

Italian-language songs
2003 singles
2003 songs